"From the Ground Up" is a song written and recorded by American country music duo Dan + Shay for their second studio album, Obsessed (2016). It was released to digital retailers on February 6, 2016, through Warner Bros. Nashville as the album's lead single and impacted American country radio on February 22, 2016. "From the Ground Up" was co-written by Chris DeStefano and was produced by group member Dan Smyers with Scott Hendricks.

The song's accompanying music video, released concurrently on February 5, was directed by Shaun Silva. Prior to its official radio release, "From the Ground Up" debuted at number 37 on the Billboard Country Airplay chart dated February 20, 2016 as the week's hot shot debut and most-added single. It has since become their second consecutive single to top the chart.

Background and composition
"From the Ground Up" is a country ballad written by Dan Smyers, Shay Mooney, and Chris DeStefano about finding true love and building a life together with that person. Inspired by the love shared by the duo member's respective grandparents, the song was written shortly after Dan lost his grandfather and while Shay's was in the hospital, and has been described by the duo as "the most special song we've ever written." The song was recorded at Ocean Waves Studios in Nashville, Tennessee and features a string section, Gordon Mote on piano, Bryan Sutton on guitar, and Nir Z on drums.

Critical reception
Markos Papadatos of Digital Journal rated the song an A, writing that "both Dan and Shay soar on harmonies" and that the song will be popular at weddings.

Commercial performance
"From the Ground Up" first entered the Country Airplay chart of February 20, 2016 at No. 37, and then debuted on the Hot Country Songs chart at No. 23 the following week when it was made available for download, selling 21,000 copies in its first week. The song reached No. 1 on the Country Airplay chart in August 2016, their second consecutive No. 1 on the chart. It peaked at number three on Hot Country Songs, making it their highest-charting single on that chart. "From the Ground Up" also debuted at number 18 on the Bubbling Under Hot 100 chart dated February 27, 2016 and spent eleven weeks on the chart, reaching a peak of six. It debuted at number 90 on the Billboard Hot 100 chart dated June 11, 2016. The song reached a peak position of 48 on the chart dated August 6, 2016, becoming the duo's second top-50 single. It was certified Platinum by RIAA on January 23, 2017. The song has sold 607,000 copies in the US as of January 2017.

In Canada, the song debuted at number 49 on the Country airplay chart dated May 21, 2016. It reached a peak position of 10 on the chart dated August 27, 2016. On the Canadian Hot 100, the song debuted and peaked at number 77 on the chart dated August 6, 2016 and remained on the chart for a single week. In December 2016, the single was certified Gold by Music Canada, indicating sales of over 40,000 units.

The song has been covered by a number of YouTubers and fans, including the all male Irish singing group, Celtic Thunder. The song is featured on their 2017 CD titled "Inspirational".

Music video
The music video for "From the Ground Up" was directed by Shaun Silva and premiered February 5, 2016. Alternating between scenes of the past and present, the video depicts a grandmother sharing stories of her younger years and wedding to her granddaughter as the younger woman plans a wedding of her own, and centers around the concept of lasting love.

Personnel
Dan + Shay
 Shay Mooney — lead vocals, background vocals
 Dan Smyers — electric guitar, background vocals

Additional musicians
 Jessica Blackwell — violin
 Charles Dixon — violin
 Elisabeth Lamb — viola
 Gordon Mote — piano, string arrangements
 Emily Nelson — cello
 Russ Pahl — pedal steel guitar
 Jimmie Lee Sloas — bass guitar
 Bryan Sutton — acoustic guitar
 Derek Wells — electric guitar
 Nir Z — drums, percussion, programming

Charts

Weekly charts

Year end charts

Certifications and sales

Release history

References

2016 songs
2016 singles
Country ballads
2010s ballads
Dan + Shay songs
Warner Records Nashville singles
Songs written by Chris DeStefano
Songs written by Shay Mooney
Songs written by Dan Smyers
Song recordings produced by Scott Hendricks
Music videos directed by Shaun Silva